Luigi Maiocco (11 October 1892 – 11 December 1965) was an Italian gymnast who competed in the 1912, 1920 and 1924 Summer Olympics. He was born in Turin. He was part of the Italian team, which won three consecutive gold medal in the gymnastics men's team event. In 1920, he finished seventh in the Individual all-round.

References

1892 births
1965 deaths
Sportspeople from Turin
Italian male artistic gymnasts
Gymnasts at the 1912 Summer Olympics
Gymnasts at the 1920 Summer Olympics
Gymnasts at the 1924 Summer Olympics
Olympic gymnasts of Italy
Olympic gold medalists for Italy
Olympic medalists in gymnastics
Medalists at the 1924 Summer Olympics
Medalists at the 1920 Summer Olympics
Medalists at the 1912 Summer Olympics